Vinga is a small island  outside Gothenburg's harbour entrance in Sweden. The 19th century Vinga Lighthouse is noted, not only as a beacon in the waterway of the Swedish west coast, but also as the place where the Swedish poet laureate Evert Taube grew up. Today Vinga is a tourist attraction, with boats to and from Gothenburg harbour.

Geology 
The bedrock of Vinga is mostly made up of porphyrite (porfyrit), a volcanic rock with less Silicon dioxide,  SiO2, than porphyry. The rock has a fine-grained structure, dark with lighter grains of feldspar and other minerals.
The mineralogical composition of the Vinga porphyry classifies it as a
monzogranite or quartz diorite. The northern part of the island contains orthopyroxene. The Vinga porphyry was created about 950 million years ago, when it penetrated the surrounding older gneiss rock.

References 

Southern Gothenburg Archipelago
Listed buildings in Gothenburg
Islands of Västra Götaland County